Teresa Lynch is a Minnesota politician and a former member of the Minnesota House of Representatives who represented District 50B, which primarily includes most of the city of Andover, Ramsey, Ham Lake and a portion of Blaine in Anoka County in the northern Twin Cities metropolitan area. Prior to the 1992 legislative redistricting, the area was known as District 50A, Lynch is a Republican.

Lynch was first elected in 1988, succeeding two-term Rep. Ernest A. Larsen.

References

1954 births
Living people
People from Andover, Minnesota
Republican Party members of the Minnesota House of Representatives
Women state legislators in Minnesota
21st-century American women